The City of Brighton was a local government area in South Australia seated at the Adelaide sea-side township of Brighton from 1858 until 1997.

History
The Corporate Town of Brighton was proclaimed on 25 November 1858 by severance from the District Council of Brighton, the latter later changing its name to Marion to avoid confusion.  The town boundaries extended from the modern Yarrum Grove, Boundary Road and Oaklands Road (Somerton Park), in the north, to Kingston Park reserve, Kingston House, Scholfield Road (Kingston Park) and Arthur Street (Seacliff Park) in the south. On the west it was bounded by the coastline and on the east by the modern Brighton Road (Somerton Park), MacArthur Avenue (Hove), Winton Avenue (Hove), Neath Avenue (South Brighton) and Davenport Terrace (Seacliff Park). The inaugural councillors named in the 1858 proclamation were: Francis Corbet Singleton, Pitt Cobbett, George William Chinner, William Home Popham, and William Voules Brown.

The municipality of Brighton ultimately became the City of Brighton when it crossed the required population threshold in the early 1900s.

Brighton and its northern coastal neighbour, the City of Glenelg, were amalgamated in 1997 to become the City of Holdfast Bay, which retained the two civic centres at Brighton and Glenelg.

Councillors

In 1919 Grace Benny was elected to Brighton council, becoming the first woman to be elected as a councillor in a local government body in South Australia.

References

Brighton, City of
1858 establishments in Australia
1997 disestablishments in Australia